A Christmas Carol (a.k.a. A Christmas Carol: Scrooge's Ghostly Tale) is a 2006 British-German computer-animated Christmas film. It is an adaptation of the 1843 Charles Dickens novella of the same name, and was produced by BKN International and BKN New Media, and was the first release in BKN's "BKN Classic Series" anthology of computer-animated direct-to-video films.

The movie was first released in the United States theatrically in select cities by Kidtoon Films on November 6, 2006. The movie was released on DVD in the United Kingdom on November 20, 2006 by BKN Home Entertainment, and a day later in the United States on November 21, 2006, by Genius Products.

This version casts the famous Dickens characters as anthropomorphic animals; Ebenezer Scrooge and his relatives are skunks, Bob Cratchit and his family are rabbits, the ghost of Jacob Marley is a cricket, the Ghost of Christmas Past, Present, and Future are a stork, kangaroo, and walrus. This version differs from the original novella in many ways; for example, the Ghost of Christmas Future actually speaks, while in most other versions he remains silent. Tiny Tim does not die in the possible future revealed to Scrooge, but instead becomes as miserly as he is. And Jacob Marley is said to be dead for two years, unlike the original in which he was dead for seven years, Scrooge's death is also different, as he drowned himself with his own greed by stacking his gold until it fell on him rather than dying of natural causes, and joins Jacob in the afterlife. Scrooge's childhood home is also shown.

Cast
Timothy Bentinck as Narrator and Ebenezer Scrooge
Jo Wyatt as Mrs. Cratchit
Brian Bowles as Bob Cratchit
Keith Wickham as Collector for the Orphanage #1, Scrooge's Father, The Ghosts of Christmas Present and Future and Jacob Marley
Teresa Gallagher as Ghost of Christmas Past, Tiny Tim and Fan
Adam Rhys Dee as Fred
Alan Marriott as Collector for the Orphanage #2 (uncredited)

See also
 List of Christmas films
 List of ghost films
 List of American films of 2006
 Adaptations of A Christmas Carol
 List of animated feature-length films

References

External links
 
 A Christmas Carol at Big Cartoon Database

2006 films
2006 computer-animated films
Animated films based on novels
Films based on A Christmas Carol
British Christmas films
British children's films
British computer-animated films
2000s American animated films
2000s Christmas films
2000s children's animated films
2006 direct-to-video films
Films produced by Rick Ungar
2000s English-language films
2000s British films